The Ectomobile (also known as the Ecto-1) is a fictional vehicle from the Ghostbusters franchise. It appears in the films Ghostbusters (1984), Ghostbusters II (1989), the reboot, where in it appears as a hearse as opposed to the original's ambulance, Ghostbusters (2016), Ghostbusters: Afterlife (2021), in the animated television series: The Real Ghostbusters, Slimer! and Extreme Ghostbusters, and in the video games Ghostbusters: The Video Game and Beeline's Ghostbusters iOS app.

Creation and conception

The Ectomobile, or Ecto-1 is a 1959 Cadillac Miller-Meteor Sentinel limo-style endloader combination car (ambulance conversion) used in the 1984 film Ghostbusters and other Ghostbusters fiction.  The original vehicle design was the creation of Steven Dane, credited as a Hardware Consultant in the credits.

In the original movie, Ray Stantz pays $4,800 for it and claims it needs a plethora of repairs. In Stantz's own words, "it needs suspension work and shocks, brakes, brake pads, lining, steering box, transmission, rear end... maybe new rings, also mufflers, a little wiring...."

After the necessary reconstruction, it is used to carry the Ghostbusters and their ghost-capturing equipment through New York City. Its features include a special pull-out rack utilizing the old ambulance's gurney in the rear containing the staff's proton packs. There are also various gadgets mounted on the top, whose function is never revealed in the movies. A cartoon episode features the proton cannon, presumably a more powerful version of a proton pack, mounted on top for use against extra-large or even giant-sized paranormal entities.

Earlier versions of scripts written by Aykroyd for the first Ghostbusters also includes mentions of the Ectomobile having the power of interdimensional travel. The shooting script for the movie describes the Ectomobile as being black, with purple and white strobe lights that gave the vehicle a "purple aura".

A miniature replica of the vehicle was mass-produced as a children's toy. Polar Lights released a 1/24 scale model kit of the Ecto-1 in 2002. In 2010, Hot Wheels released a "Ghostbusters Ecto-1" as part of the "2010 Hot Wheels Premiere" series.

Hot Wheels Elite released a highly detailed 1/18 diecast of the Ecto-1 in 2010 and in early 2013, they released a 1/18 Ecto-1A as seen in Ghostbusters II.

The repaired Ectomobile is named on-screen with the license plate shown reading "Ecto-1". The word Ectomobile was only used in the song "Cleaning Up The Town" from the film's soundtrack. The filmmakers planned to have the Ecto-1 painted black, but the color of the vehicle was changed to white when it was decided a black car would be too difficult to see during night scenes. Three cars have played the vehicle in the movies; the third 1959 Miller-Meteor was purchased after the second died during shooting of Ghostbusters II. The black Miller-Meteor seen at the beginning of the first movie was leased and used only for that scene and never converted for filming, though it was later purchased by the studio and completely converted to a full Ecto-1 for touring. Both of the other Ectomobiles are currently sitting in a Sony pictures backlot, having undergone a full restoration after years of deterioration.

The Universal Studios "Spooktacular" stage show featured an Ectomobile replica built by a man from Tennessee. The Universal Studios Ecto-1 Replica was sold at the Barrett-Jackson auto auction in Scottsdale Arizona on January 22, 2010, for $80,000. Another replica was made by Peter Mosen and bought by George Barris. Yet another replica currently resides at Historic Auto Attractions museum in Roscoe, Illinois.

History

Ghostbusters (1984)
The vehicle used for Ecto-1 was a 1959 Cadillac professional chassis, built by the Miller-Meteor company. The ambulance/hearse combination was the end loader variety. Dr. Ray Stantz found the vehicle in 1984, shortly after he mortgaged his mother's house to buy the Firehouse. Because of his mechanical skills, he was able to repair the vehicle, which he acquired for $4,800. After repairs were completed, the vehicle had quite a unique character. It became a well-recognized symbol for the Ghostbusters franchise. The vehicle had enough room in it to store Proton Packs for all of the crew, along with Ecto Goggles, P.K.E. Meters, and a slew of traps.

Ghostbusters II
After the Ghostbusters were shut down, Ecto-1 was used primarily for transport to and from appearances at such places as children's birthday parties. It fell into a state of disrepair and was seen spewing smoke, and had other various mechanical problems. Following the Ghostbusters' return to business in 1989 after capturing the Scoleri Brothers, Ecto-1 got an overhaul and was renamed Ecto-1a, although it was eventually reverted back to Ecto-1.

Before Ghostbusters: Afterlife
When his colleagues refused to believe his warnings of Gozer's potential return, Egon Spengler stole all of the team's equipment, including Ecto-1, and relocated to a farmhouse in Summerville, Oklahoma. At some point, an extendable gunner seat was added to the right rear passenger area and the corresponding door was modified to fold flat against the vehicle body, allowing a team member to fire a Proton Pack without having to lean out a window. A folding ramp was also installed in the floor to assist in deployment of the Remote Trap Vehicle (RTV), a ghost trap fitted with a radio-controlled car that can follow the Cadillac. There is also a compartment in the vehicle that can carry the RTV.

Ghostbusters: Afterlife
In June 2021, Spengler's grandson Trevor found Ecto-1 on the grounds of the farm inherited by his mother Callie. The vehicle had deteriorated in storage to the point of being completely non-functional, but Trevor repaired it with help from Spengler's ghost. He, his sister Phoebe, and her friend Podcast used Ecto-1 and the RTV to capture a ghost named Muncher, but the three were arrested for the damage they caused and Ecto-1 was impounded at the Summerville County Sheriff's Department along with the RTV. The next day, amid the chaos caused by the interdimensional cross-rip and with the police preoccupied by the situation, the children recovered Ecto-1 and the RTV from the now-empty police department (freeing Muncher in the process) and drove to the Shandor Mining Company, aided by Trevor's friend Lucky Domingo. After the four captured Gozer's minion Zuul using the RTV, they drove back to the farm in order to lure Gozer into a field of ghost traps placed by Spengler and capture it with the help of the Ghostbusters; however, Gozer caught up to them at the last second and destroyed the RTV, releasing Zuul. During the confrontation with Gozer, Mini-Pufts snuck onto Ecto-1 and attempted to sabotage the vehicle's equipment, but Podcast eventually repels them with a taser. Following Gozer's defeat, Winston Zeddemore had Ecto-1 fully restored and delivered to the Ghostbusters' old firehouse.

Other versions
Throughout other Ghostbusters fiction, a number of other Ectomobiles are introduced.
 In the 1984 computer game adaptation, players are given the choice between the 1959 hearse (which looked the most like Ecto-1), a cheap VW Beetle, a spacious station wagon and a high performance (but low-capacity) sports car.
 Ecto-1a is an upgraded version of the Ecto-1, seen only in Ghostbusters II, which includes more technical equipment on the vehicle's roof and digital announcement boards on each side of it. The logo is updated and added to the hood. The vehicle also sports strips of yellow and black along either side.
 A new Ecto-1 based on a 1984 Cadillac Fleetwood hearse appears in the 2016 reboot, originating as a hearse borrowed by Patty Tolan from her uncle's funeral home. Even after being repainted, modified to carry the team's equipment, and fitted with a nuclear reactor, it retains its original red roof color. They deliberately destroy it by overloading its systems with beams from their proton packs, in order to force a swarm of invading ghosts back through the portal they had used to enter the material world.
 Ecto-1b is featured in Ghostbusters: The Video Game; the 1b is similar to the 1a, but features upgraded equipment and the addition of the Super Slammer Trap, an enhanced capacity ghost trap, on its roof.
 Ectotron is a Cybertronian who can transform into the Ecto-1. He was first introduced in the Ghostbusters/Transformers crossover comic "Ghosts of Cybertron" published by IDW Publishing, and was released as a Transformers figure by Hasbro and Takara Tomy as a GameStop and Hasbro Pulse exclusive. It was released alongside a Ghostbusters-themed MP-10 Optimus Prime.
 Ecto-2 is a small open-topped two-seater autogyro is seen in the cartoons and the comic based on them, and was released as a toy.
 In the 2016 reboot film, Ecto-2 is a white Ghostbusters motorbike provided by Kevin just before Rowan possesses him.
 Ecto-3 has been the name of three different vehicles:
 a motorized unicycle and sidecar that slips into the Ecto-1's rear fender in the Real Ghostbusters episode "The Joke's on Ray"
 a time-distortion jet-like vehicle invented by Egon in the comics that is renamed Ecto-4 after the cartoon's unicycle version debuted
 a go-kart-like vehicle sold as a toy
 Ecto-Bomber is an airplane based on the Kenner toy.
 Extreme Ecto-1 is seen in the Extreme Ghostbusters TV series. The vehicle is equipped with new detection equipment and emergency lights, and has wheelchair access for Garrett Miller.  It is mentioned that before the adaptations were made it was a 1970s Cadillac hearse.
 Ecto-Ichi (ichi means "one" in Japanese) is an extremely high tech six-wheeled Ectomobile supplied to the Ghostbusters by the Japanese government for a job in Tokyo. It can fly and travel on water, but is destroyed when a Godzilla-esque monster stepped on it.
 Ecto-8 is featured in the 2009 video game, and is a tugboat used to transport the team to Shandor island. It is driven by Ray, who refers to it as "Marine Ecto-8". Ecto-8 is identical in body to a traditional tugboat, but has a white paint scheme and the logo on the side.
 A Ghostbusters video game in development in 2007 featured a more modern version of the Ectomobile based on a stretched Chrysler 300C.
 A Lego version of the Ecto-1 appears in Lego Dimensions.
 Ecto-1 is available in the Planet Coaster Ghostbusters DLC.

References

Ghostbusters
Art vehicles
Fictional cars